Carpophilus marginellus is a species of sap-feeding beetle in the family Nitidulidae. It is found in Australia, Europe and Northern Asia (excluding China and Russia), North America, and Oceania.

References

Further reading

External links

 

Nitidulidae
Articles created by Qbugbot
Beetles described in 1858